Kirov is a rural locality (a selo) in Tarkayinsky Rural Okrug of Nyurbinsky District in the Sakha Republic, Russia, located  from Nyurba, the administrative center of the district and  from Khatyn-Sysy, the administrative center of the rural okrug. Its population as of the 2002 Census was 275.

References

Notes

Sources
Official website of the Sakha Republic. Registry of the Administrative-Territorial Divisions of the Sakha Republic. Nyurbinsky District. 

Rural localities in Nyurbinsky District